Communauté d'agglomération Gaillac-Graulhet is the communauté d'agglomération, an intercommunal structure, centred on the towns of Gaillac and Graulhet. It is located in the Tarn department, in the Occitania region, southern France. Created in 2017, its seat is in Gaillac. Its area is 1164.4 km2. Its population was 74,286 in 2019.

Composition
The communauté d'agglomération consists of the following 59 communes:

Alos
Amarens
Andillac
Aussac
Beauvais-sur-Tescou
Bernac
Brens
Briatexte
Broze
Busque
Cadalen
Cahuzac-sur-Vère
Campagnac
Castanet
Castelnau-de-Montmiral
Cestayrols
Coufouleux
Donnazac
Fayssac
Fénols
Florentin
Frausseilles
Gaillac
Giroussens
Graulhet
Grazac
Itzac
Labastide-de-Lévis
Labessière-Candeil
Lagrave
Larroque
Lasgraisses
Lisle-sur-Tarn
Loupiac
Mézens
Montans
Montdurausse
Montels
Montgaillard
Montvalen
Parisot
Peyrole
Puybegon
Puycelsi
Rabastens
Rivières
Roquemaure
Saint-Beauzile
Sainte-Cécile-du-Cayrou
Saint-Gauzens
Saint-Urcisse
Salvagnac
La Sauzière-Saint-Jean
Senouillac
Tauriac
Técou
Tonnac
Le Verdier
Vieux

References

Gaillac-Graulhet
Gaillac-Graulhet